Har HaAri (Lion Mountain; , Mount Haidar) is a mountain in the Upper Galilee in northern Israel.

History
With its 1047 meters (3435 ft) it is one of the highest mountains in Israel and is located about 1 kilometer south of Beit Jann. It is close to the Druze shrine of Baha' ad-Din, probably dedicated to the founding Druze leader of this name.

The mountain is a popular place for paragliding in part because of the landscape visible from there. On a clear day you can see the Gilboa Mountains and the Mediterranean Sea from it.

Climate
Har HaAri has a Mediterranean climate with hot summers and cold, damp and sometimes snowy winters. Its altitude makes it vulnerable to strong winds at any time of the year. The precipitation rate on the mountain is high and reaches nearly 1000 mm. Most precipitation falls between October and May.

Geography
Har HaAri is located in the Upper Galilee and is 1047 meters (3435 ft) high. Note that the directions of the below chart are reversed to fit the view of the panorama.

See also
Geography of Israel

References

Mountains of Israel